Thirunelveli is a 2000 Indian Tamil-language drama film, directed by Bharathi Kannan. The film stars Prabhu and Roja while Karan, Udhaya and Sithara among others form an ensemble cast.  Music for the film was composed by Ilaiyaraaja and the film was released on 15 January 2000.

Plot 
Thulasi (Prabhu) is a rich landlord in Tirunelveli who lives with his brother Varadappan (Karan) and mother (Manorama). Varadappan has a wife (Sithara), son (Shankthi Kumar), and a daughter Rani (Vindhya). Thulasi is well-respected in his hometown, and he never lies at any circumstance. A small flashback is shown where Thulasi was in love with Roja, but she died. Enmity prevails between Thulasi and Soonaswamy (S. S. Chandran). Udhaya is appointed as Varadappan's car driver, and love blossoms between Udhaya and Rani. Thulasi realizes this but does not disclose this to Varadappan, as he would try to separate the couple. Soonaswamy joins hands with Velu Nayakkar Ponnambalam, local thug and tries to separate Thulasi and Varadappan, in which he succeeds. Thulasi leaves home with his mother. Now, Varadappan finds out about Rani's love affair and decides to kill her and Udhaya. The couple runs to Thulasi for life. Thulasi hides them in his home. When Varadappan inquires about the couple to Thulasi, he lies that he is not aware of their whereabouts. Varadappan leaves the place, believing that Thulasi will never lie. The couple thanks Thulasi for saving their lives but are shocked to see him dead. Varadappan then realizes his mistake and apologizes. The couple is united.

Cast 

 Prabhu as Thulasi
 Roja as Thulasi's former lover
 Karan as Varadappan
 Sithara as Varadappan's wife
 Vindhya as Rani
 Manorama as Thulasi's mother
 Udhaya as Rani's husband
 S. S. Chandran as Soonaswamy
 Ponnambalam as Soonaswamy's friend
 Vivek as Soonaswamy's son
 Thalapathy Dinesh
 Ramya Krishnan as Azhagamma (Dancer) in "Yele Azhagamma"
Raghava Lawrence as dancer in "Yele Azhagamma"

Soundtrack 
Soundtrack was composed by Ilaiyaraaja.

Reception 
Malini Mannath wrote for Chennai Online, "The director, like the audience, seems to have had enough of filial bonding, and takes recourse to the caste factor to pep up his narration [...] Vivek's comedy track is weird, but provides some welcome relief". Tamil Star wrote, "It is Prabhu's sensitive portrayal and a more gripping narrative after the interval that have saved the film from slipping into mediocrity [...] Fight scenes are well executed . But Ilayaraja's music is disappointing".

References

External links 
 
 

2000 drama films
2000 films
2000s Tamil-language films
Films directed by Bharathi Kannan
Films scored by Ilaiyaraaja
Films shot in Tirunelveli
Indian drama films
Super Good Films films